The 1982 ARFU Asian Rugby Championship was the 8th edition of the tournament and was played in Singapore. The 8 teams were divided in two pools with a final match between the winners from the two.  South Korea won the tournament.

Tournament

Pool A

Pool B

Finals

Third Place Final

First Place Final

References

1982
1982 rugby union tournaments for national teams
International rugby union competitions hosted by Singapore
rugby union